Jonathan Koch may refer to:

 Jonathan Koch (producer), producer of The Kennedys and Urban Tarzan
 Jonathan Koch (rower) (born 1985), German rower